Guillaume N. Beaurpere is a United States Army brigadier general who is the Commanding General of the United States Army John F. Kennedy Special Warfare Center and School. He was previously the Commanding General (Operations) of the United States Army Space and Missile Defense Command.

References

External links

Year of birth missing (living people)
Living people
Place of birth missing (living people)
United States Army generals